Yui Kamiji and Jordanne Whiley defeated the defending champions Jiske Griffioen and Aniek van Koot in the final, 6–4, 4–6, [10–6] to win the women's doubles wheelchair tennis title at the 2016 French Open. It was the third consecutive year that the two teams contested the final.

Seeds

Draw

Finals

References
 Draw

Wheelchair Women's Doubles
French Open, 2016 Women's Doubles